James L. Jamison (died July 2, 1873) was a farmer, teacher, businessman, and state legislator in South Carolina.

Jamison sat in the South Carolina Senate representing Orangeburg during the Reconstruction era. He was a Republican elected to terms in 1870 and 1872. He was African American. He was a teacher of freedmen. In 1878, after Democrats regained control state government in South Carolina, he was accused of receiving a payoff in lieu of a debt he was owed from an insolvent bank propped up by legislators who were paid off.

See also
African-American officeholders during and following the Reconstruction era

References

1873 deaths
African-American politicians during the Reconstruction Era
African-American state legislators in South Carolina
19th-century American politicians
Republican Party South Carolina state senators
Educators from South Carolina
African-American educators
People from Orangeburg, South Carolina
19th-century American educators
Place of birth missing
Date of birth missing